D'Iberville is a Canadian dramatic adventure television series which aired on Radio-Canada in 1967 and 1968, and on CBC Television's English network from 1968 to 1969.

Premise
The series is a dramatic portrayal based on the adventures of Pierre Le Moyne d'Iberville (Albert Millaire) in late 17th century when the British, Dutch and French were rivals for North American lands and the fur trade.

The initial episodes concerned Lemoyne's early years when his father explored Lake Ontario, in the context of competition between Chevalier de La Salle and Sieur de LaBarre. In 1685, Jacques-René de Brisay de Denonville, Marquis de Denonville became governor of New France.

In the second phase of the series, episodes featured d'Iberville's early military career under the Chevalier de Troyes and the expeditions to Hudson's Bay and their capture of various forts in that region.

Finally, the series concludes with episodes featuring d'Iberville commanding naval troops during the New England Campaign near the beginning of the 18th century.

Production
Radio-Canada produced D'Iberville in co-production with ORTF (France) and Radio-Télévision Belge (Belgium), Société suisse de radiodiffusion (Switzerland).

Episodes were filmed in colour at Île d'Orléans, Quebec with sets which resembled 17th century Quebec. The production featured a reconstruction of d'Iberville's ship, the Pelican. The cast featured 175 actors.

Scheduling
This half-hour series was broadcast on CBC's English network on Mondays at 4:30 p.m. (Eastern) from 7 October 1968 to 23 June 1969. It was rebroadcast Saturdays at 1:30 p.m. from September to November 1969, and from February to March 1970. An English dub of the series was produced later.

This is D'Iberville, a making-of documentary of the series was produced by Brian O'Leary, It was broadcast on 7 August 1967 through CBC television.

Cast
 Albert Millaire as Pierre Le Moyne d'Iberville
 Jean Besre as Paul Lemoyne, Sieur de Maricourt
 Alexandre Rigneault as Jacques Le Ber
 Jacques Monod as Joseph-Antoine de La Barre
 Francois Rozet as Charles le Moyne de Longueuil et de Châteauguay (d'Iberville's father)
 Gilles Pelletier as Jacques-René de Brisay de Denonville, Marquis de Denonville
 Yves Letourneau as La Salle
 Leo Ilial as Pierre de Troyes, Chevalier de Troyes.

References

External links
 
 
 D'Iberville Episode

CBC Television original programming
1968 Canadian television series debuts
1969 Canadian television series endings